Miche–Guerciotti is a UCI Continental cycling team active from 2003. The team is managed by Mauro Tognaccini with assistance from directeur sportifs Marco Tozzi, Giuseppe Tognaccini and Todor Kolev.

Major wins

2003
Stage 1 & 5b Tour of Bulgaria, Fabio Borghesi
Stage 2 Tour of Bulgaria, Balasz Rohtmer
2004
Gran Premio Industria e Commercio Artigianato Carnaghese, Christian Murro
 Russia, Time Trial Championship, Alexander Bespalov
GP Città di Rio Saliceto e Correggio, Przemysław Niemiec
2005
Stage 1 Giro del Trentino, Przemysław Niemiec
Overall Tour of Slovenia, Przemysław Niemiec
Stage 3, Przemysław Niemiec
2006
Giro di Toscana, Przemysław Niemiec
Stage 3 Route du Sud, Przemysław Niemiec
2007
Giro della Romagna, Eddy Serri
Stage 3b Tour of Bulgaria, Krzysztof Szczawinski
Stage 8 Tour of Bulgaria, Pasquale Muto
2008
Giro del Mendrisiotto, Eddy Serri
Stage 3 Route du Sud, Przemysław Niemiec
2009
Stage 2 Giro del Trentino, Przemysław Niemiec
Overall Route du Sud, Przemysław Niemiec
Stage 2, Przemysław Niemiec
Stage 1 Tour de Slovaquie, Pasquale Muto
2010
Stage 3 Settimana Internazionale di Coppi e Bartali, Przemysław Niemiec
Stage 2 Tour des Pyrénées, Przemysław Niemiec
2011
Stage 4 Tour du Maroc, Roberto Cesaro
Stage 10 Tour du Maroc, Leonardo Pinizzotto
Stages 1 & 2b Vuelta a Asturias, Stefan Schumacher
Stage 5 Vuelta a Asturias, Constantino Zaballa
Stages 1 & 6 Azerbaijan Tour, Stefan Schumacher
Tre Valli Varesine, Davide Rebellin
Trofeo Melinda, Davide Rebellin

Team roster
As of 28 January 2012.

References

External links
 

UCI Continental Teams (Europe)
Cycling teams based in Italy
Cycling teams established in 2003